Der Schwammerlkönig is a German television series.

See also
List of German television series

External links
 

Television shows set in Bavaria
1988 German television series debuts
1988 German television series endings
German-language television shows
Das Erste original programming